Short Creek is a stream in Louisa and Washington counties, Iowa, in the United States. It is a tributary of the Iowa River.

Short Creek was so named from the fact it is shorter than nearby Long Creek.

See also
List of rivers of Iowa

References

Rivers of Louisa County, Iowa
Rivers of Washington County, Iowa
Rivers of Iowa